Star Star Stereo was an independent record label based in Milwaukee, Wisconsin.

The label existed from 1997–2001 and was operated by Mike Bailey.  Star Star released an eclectic mix of post-rock, electronic, indie rock and Americana.  The catalog includes records by Pelé (whose lineup boasted members of the Promise Ring and future members of Collections of Colonies of Bees), Casino Versus Japan, Charles Atlas and solo projects from Lambchop’s, Deanna Varagona, and Low’s, Alan Sparhawk.

Star Star Stereo became dormant when Bailey turned his focus to an A&R position at Back Porch Records (EMI).

Bailey died on February 29, 2020.

Discography
 Ex Chittle – The Good Moments 7" (str-01/1997)
 Dart – Dart CDEP (str-02/1998)
 Pele – Teaching the History of Teaching Geography CD (str-03/1998)
 Deanna Varagona - Hesitation 7" (str-04/1998)
 Casino Versus Japan – Casino Versus Japan CD (str-05/1998)
 Dakota Suite – Alone With Everybody CD (str-06/1999)
 Pele – People Living With Animals. Animals Kill People CD (str-07/1998)
 Casino Versus Japan / Jessica Bailiff - Split 7" (str-08/2000)
 Charles Atlas – Two More Hours CD (str-09/1999)
 Charles Atlas – Play the Spaces CD (str-10/2000)
 Alan Sparhawk / Charles Atlas – Split 7" (str-11/1999)
 Sixto – Sixto CD (str-12/2000)
 Deanna Varagona – Tangled Messages CD (str-13/2000)

References

External links
 Official website, 

American independent record labels